Aestuariibaculum scopimerae  is a Gram-negative and non-motile bacterium from the genus of Aestuariibaculum which has been isolated from a crab from the Yellow Sea on Korea.

References 

Flavobacteria
Bacteria described in 2013